Bective Rangers Football Club is a rugby union club in Dublin, Ireland founded in 1881.
The Club is affiliated to the Leinster Branch of the Irish Rugby Football Union and play in Division 1A of the Leinster League. 
The club plays its games at the Donnybrook Rugby Ground in Donnybrook with a second grounds at Glenamuck.
The Club fields teams from Mini's, Youth, U20's Juniors, Senior and Vets.

History
The club origins stem from the establishment of Bective House College by Dr. John Lardner Burke at 15 Rutland Square (now Parnell Square East) in 1834. Bective house was owned by the Earl of Bective for whom the school was also named. The title of Earl of Bective was taken from the Earl's estate at Bective Abbey and castle in County Meath.

The club was originally named Bective College and later Bective FC from the 1870s. It was officially founded in 1881.

Honours
All-Ireland Cup
1922–23, 1924–25
 Leinster Senior Cup
1889, 1892, 1910, 1914, 1923, 1925, 1932, 1934, 1935, 1955, 1956, 1962
 Leinster League Division 1
2021-22.

Current coaching team
Head of Coaching: Bernard Jackman
Director of Rugby: Bernard Jackman
First Team Manager: Shane Dunne
Head of Mini Rugby: Richard Maybury
S & C coach :

Notable former players

  Denis Coulson
  Danie Poolman
  Trevor Brennan
  James Leo Farrell
  Cliff Morgan
  Paddy O'Donoghue

Notable former coaches
  Mike Ruddock
 Harry Williams

Notable persons
 Louis Magee; President of the IRFU 2014/2015
 Joe Nolan

References

External links
Bective Rangers website

 
Rugby clubs established in 1881
Irish rugby union teams
Rugby union clubs in Dublin (city)
Donnybrook, Dublin
1881 establishments in Ireland